was a Japanese celebrity chef who specialized in ramen. He was called the Oni of Ramen in Japan. He founded the Shinasobaya Company and helped run the Shin-Yokohama Raumen Museum.

Minoru Sano was born in Totsuka-ku in the city of Yokohama in Kanagawa Prefecture, Japan. He had numerous appearances in the Japanese media. He had many ramen chef disciples.

References 

1951 births
2014 deaths
People from Yokohama
Japanese company founders
Japanese chefs